This is a list of invasive species in Portugal. The species tagged with a cross (†) have the legal status of invasive species (Decreto-Lei n.º 565/99 de 21 de Dezembro). The remaining are considered invasive by investigators in Portugal. The species tagged with an "M" are classified as invasive only in Madeira.

Invertebrates 

 Adelges piceae (balsam woolly adelgid)
 Aleurodicus dispersus (spiralling whitefly)
 Anguillicoloides crassus (swim bladder worm)
 Aphis spiraecola (Spirea aphid)
 Ceratitis capitata (Mediterranean fruit fly)
 Chilo suppressalis (striped rice stem borer)
 Cinara cupressi (Cypress aphid)
 Corbicula fluminea (Asian clam)(†)
 Cryptotermes brevis (powderpost termite)
 Ctenarytaina eucalypti (blue gum psyllid)
 Deroceras invadens (tramp slug)
 Elminius modestus (Australasian barnacle)
 Eriocheir sinensis (Chinese mitten crab)(†)
 Frankliniella occidentalis (western flower thrips)
 Globodera rostochiensis (yellow potato cyst nematode)
 Icerya purchasi (cottony cushion scale)
 Leptinotarsa decemlineata (Colorado potato beetle)(†)
 Linepithema humile (Argentine ant)(†)
 Lumbricus terrestris (common earthworm)
 Lysiphlebus testaceipes(†)
 Opogona sacchari (banana moth)
 Pacifastacus leniusculus (signal crayfish)(†)
 Paratrechina longicornis (longhorn crazy ant)
 Phoracantha semipunctata (Australian Eucalyptus longhorn)(†)
Popillia japonica (Japanese beetle)
 Potamopyrgus antipodarum (New Zealand mud snail)(†)
 Procambarus clarkii (red swamp crawfish)(†)
 Styela clava (Asian tunicate)
 Thaumastocoris peregrinus (bronze bug)
 Tricellaria inopinata
 Vespa velutina nigrithorax (Yellow-legged Asian hornet)

Amphibians
 Bufo marinus (†)
 Lithobates catesbeianus (†)
 Rana ridibunda (†)
 Xenopus laevis (†)

Reptiles 

 Chamaeleo chamaeleon (common chameleon) (†)
 Chelydra serpentina (†)
 Chrysemys picta (†)
 Graptemys spp. (†)
 Hemidactylus mabouia  (†) (M)
 Macroclemys temminckii (†)
 Pseudemys spp. (†)
 Ramphotyphlops braminus (†) (M)
 Tarentola mauritanica (†) (M)
 Lacerta dugesii (Madeiran wall lizard)(†)
 Lampropeltis getula ssp. californiae (†) (M)
 Trachemys spp. (†)

Fish 
 Ameiurus melas (black bullhead)(†)
 Australoheros facetus (chameleon cichlid)(†)
 Carassius auratus (goldfish)(†)
 Cyprinus carpio (common carp)(†)
 Esox lucius (northern pike)(†)
 Fundulus heteroclitus (mummichog)(†)
 Gambusia holbrooki (eastern mosquitofish)(†)
 Gobio gobio (gudgeon)(†)
 Lepomis gibbosus (pumpkinseed)(†)
 Micropterus salmoides (largemouth bass)(†)
 Oncorhynchus mykiss (rainbow trout)(†)
 Sander lucioperca (Sander lucioperca)(†)

Birds 

Source:

Family Anatidae:
 Oxyura jamaicensis

Family Columbidae:
 Columbina passerina(†)

Family Estrildidae:
 Amadina fasciata(†)
 Amandava amandava(†)
 Amandava subflava(†)
 Estrilda astrild(†)
 Estrilda melpoda(†)
 Estrilda troglodytes(†)
 Lonchura cantans(†)
 Lonchura maja(†)
 Lonchura malacca(†)
 Taeniopygia castanotis(†)

Family Phasianidae:
 Francolinus francolinus(†)
 Phasianus colchicus(†)

Family Ploceidae:
 Euplectes afer(†)
 Euplectes franciscanus(†)
 Euplectes hordeaceus(†)
 Euplectes orix(†)
 Ploceus cucullatus(†)
 Ploceus melanocephalus(†)
 Quelea quelea(†)

Family Psittacidae:
 Myiopsitta monachus(†)
 Psittacula krameri(†)

Mammals 
 Ammotragus lervia (†)
 Callosciurus erythraeus (†)
 Capra hircus (†) (M)
 Castor canadensis (†)
 Erinaceus spp. (†) (M)
 Felis silvestris f. catus (†) *
 Herpestes javanicus (†)
 Hystrix cristata (†)
 Muntiacus reevesi (†)
 Mus musculus (†) (M)
 Mus domesticus (†) (M)
 Mustela spp. (†) (M)
 Mustela furo (ferret)
 Myocastor coypus (†)
 Nasua nasua (†)
 Neogale vison (American mink) (†)
 Nyctereutes procyonoides (†)
 Ondatra zibethicus (†)
 Oryctolagus cuniculus (†) (M)
 Procyon spp. (†)
 Rattus spp. (†) (M)
 Rattus norvegicus (brown rat)(†)
 Rattus rattus (black rat)(†)
 Sciurus carolinensis (†)
 Sciurus niger (†)
 Tamias sibiricus (†)

Plants 

Abutilon sonneratianum (†) (M) (Cav.) Sweet
 Acacia spp. (†)
 Acacia baileyana F.Muell
 Acacia cyanophylla Lindley (=Acacia saligna (Labill.) H.L.Wendl.)
 Acacia cyclops A.Cunn. ex G.Don
 Acacia dealbata Link.
 Acacia decurrens (J.C.Wendl) Willd.
 Acacia karroo Hayne
 Acacia longifolia (Andrews) Willd.
 Acacia mearnsii DeWild.
 Acacia melanoxylon R.Br.
 Acacia pycnantha
 Acacia retinodes Schlecht
 Acanthus mollis (†) (M) L.
 Acer negundo (†) L.
 Acer pseudoplatanus (†) (M) L.
 Adiantum hispidulum (†) (M) Sw.
 Adiantum raddianum (†) (MadMeira) Sw.
 Agapanthus praecox ssp. orientalis (†) (M) F. M. Leight
 Adiantum hispidulum (†) (M) Sw.
 Agave americana (†) L.
 Ageratina adenophora (†) (Spreng.) R.M.King & H.Rob.
 Ageratina riparia (†) (M) (Regel) R. M. King & H. Rob.
 Ailanthus altissima (Miller) Swingle
 Albizia lophanta (†) (Willd.) Nielsen (=Paraserianthes lophanta (Willd.) Benth)
 Albizzia julibrissin (†) Durazz.
 Ailanthus altissima (†) (Miller) Swingle
 Aloe arborescens (†) (M) Mill.
 Alternanthera philoxeroides (†) (Mart.) Griseb.
 Alternanthera caracasana (†) Kunth
 Alternanthera nodiflora (†) R. Br.
 Alternanthera pungens (†) Kunth
 Amaranthus albus (†) L.
 Amaranthus blitoides (†) S. Watson
 Amaranthus blitum ssp. emarginatus (†) (Moq. ex Uline & Bray) Carretero, Muñoz Garmendia & Pedrol
 Amaranthus caudatus (†) L.
 Amaranthus cruentus (†) L.
 Amaranthus deflexus (†) L.
 Amaranthus hybridus (†) L.
 Amaranthus hypochondriacus (†) L.
 Amaranthus muricatus (†) (Gillies ex Moq.) Hieron.
 Amaranthus paniculatus (†) L.
 Amaranthus powellii (†) S. Watson
 Amaranthus retroflexus (†) L.
 Amaranthus viridis (†) L.
 Amaranthus x ozanonii (†) Thell. ex Priszter
 Amaryllis belladonna (†) (M) Kunth
 Aptenia cordifolia (†) (M) (L. f.) Schwantes
 Araujia sericifera (†) Brot.
 Arctotheca calendula (†) (L.) Levyns
 Arctotheca calendula (L.) Levins
 Arundo donax (†) L.
 Asclepias curassavica (†) L.
 Asclepias syriaca (†) L.
 Asparagus asparagoides (†) (M) (L.) Druce
 Aster squamatus (†) (Spreng.) Hieron.
 Atriplex rosea (†) (M) L.
 Atriplex semibaccata (†) (M) R. Br.
 Azolla caroliniana Willd.
 Azolla filiculoides (†) Lam.
 Baccharis halimifolia (†) L.
 Baccharis spicata (†) (Lam.) Baill.
 Bidens aurea (†) (Aiton) Sherff
 Bidens frondosa (†) L.
 Bidens pilosa (†) L.
 Brachiaria mutica (†) (M) (Forssk.) Stapf
 Cabomba caroliniana (†) Gray
 Cardiospermum grandiflorum (†) (M) Sw.
 Carpobrotus acinaciformis (†) (L.) L. Bolus
 Carpobrotus edulis (L.)N.E.Br.
 Cenchrus ciliaris (†) (M) L.
 Centranthus ruber (†) (M) (L.) DC.
 Chasmanthe aethiopica (†) (M) (L.) N.E. Br.
 Chrysanthemum coronarium (†) (M) L.
 Cirsium vulgare (†) (M) (Savi) Ten.
 Colocasia esculenta (†) (M) (L.) Schott
 Commelina diffusa (†) (M) Burm. F.
 Conyza bonariensis (†) (L.) Cronq.
 Conyza canadensis (†) L.
 Conyza sumatrensis (†) (Retz.) E. Walker
 Coronopus didymus (†) (L.) J.E. Sm.
 Cortaderia selloana (†) (J.A. & J.H. Schultes) Aschers & Graebner
 Cotula australis (†) (M) (Sieber ex Spreng.) Hook. fil.
 Cotula coronopifolia (†) L.
 Crassula ovata (†) (M) (Mill.) Druce
 Crassula multicava (†) (M) Lem.
 Crinum bulbispermum (†) (M) (Burm.) Milne-Redh. & Schweick.
 Crocosmia x crocosmiiflora (†) (M) (Lemoine) N.E. Br.
 Cyperus rotundus (†) L.
 Cyrtomium falcatum (†) (M) (L. fil.) C. Presl
 Cytisus scoparius (†) (M) (L.) Link
 Cytisus striatus (†) (M) (Hill) Rothm
 Datura innoxia (†) (M) Mill.
 Datura stramonium L.
 Delairea odorata (†) (M) Lem. (= Senecio mikanoides Otto ex Walp.)
 Doodia caudata (†) (M) (Cav.) R. Br.
 Duchesnea indica (†) (M) (Andr.) Focke
 Egeria densa (†) Planch.
 Eichhornia crassipes (†) (C.R.P..Mart.) Solms. Laub.
 Elodea canadensis (†) Mich.
 Elodea nuttallii (†) (Planch.) St. John
 Erigeron karvinskianus DC.
 Eryngium pandanifolium Cham. & Schlecht
 Eschscholzia californica (†) Champ. (M)
 Eucalyptus globulus Labill
 Fallopia baldschuanica (†) (Regel) J. Holub
 Fallopia japonica (†) (Houtt.) Ronse Decr. (= Reynoutria japonica Houtt.)
 Fallopia sachalinensis (†) (Schmidt) Ronse Decr.
 Fallopia x bohemica (†) (J. Chrtek & A. Chrtková) J. P. Bailey
 Fuchsia arborescens (†) Sims (M)
 Fuchsia magellanica (†) Lam. (M)
 Galinsoga parviflora Cav.
 Galinsoga quadriradiata (†) Ruiz et Pav. (M)
 Gleditsia triacanthos (†) L.
 Gomphocarpus fruticosus (†) (L.) Aiton fil.
 Gunnera tinctoria (†) (Molina) Mirbel
 Hakea salicifolia (†) (Vent.) B.L.Burtt
 Hakea sericea (†) Schrader - Háquia-picante
 Hedychium gardnerianum (†) Sheppard ex Ker Grwal
 Helichrysum foetidum (†) (M) (L.) Cass.
 Heracleum mantegazzianum (†) Sommier & Levier
 Heracleum persicum (†) Fischer
 Heracleum sosnowskyi (†) Mandenova
 Holcus lanatus (†) (M) L.
 Hydrangea macrophylla (†) (M) (Thunb.) Ser.
 Hydrilla verticillata (†) (L. f.) Royle
 Hydrocotyle ranunculoides (†) L. f.
 Impatiens glandulifera (†) Royle
 Ipomoea acuminata (†) (Vahl.) Roemer & Schultes
 Ipomoea indica (†) (Burm.) Merr.
 Ipomea purpurea (†) (M) (L.) Roth
 Isatis tinctoria (†) (M) L.
 Kalanchoe daigremontiana (†) (M) Raym.-Hamet & H. Perrier
 Kalanchoe delagoensis (†) (M) Eckl. et Zeyh.
 Kalanchoe fedtschenkoi (†) (M) Raym.-Hamet et Perrier
 Kalanchoe pinnata (†) (M) (Lam.) Pers. N
 Lagarosiphon major (†) (Ridley) Moss
 Lantana camara (†) L.
 Lepidium didymum (†) (M) L.
 Leptospermum scoparium (†) (M) J. R. Forst. & G. Forst.
 Leucaena leucocephala (†) (M) (Lam.) De Wit
 Leycesteria formosa (†) (M) Wall.
 Lonicera japonica (†) Thunb.
 Ludwigia grandiflora (†) (Michx.) Greuter & Burdet
 Ludwigia peploides (†) (Kunth) Raven
 Ludwigia uruguayensis (†) (Cambess.) H.Hara
 Lycopersicon esculentum (†) (M) Mill. var. esculentum
 Lysichiton americanus (†) Hultén & St. John
 Malephora crocea (†) (M) (Jacq.) Schwantes
 Melinis repens (†) (M) (Willd.) Zizka
 Malvastrum coromandelianum (†) (M) (L.) Garcke
 Microstegium vimineum (†) (Trin.) A. Camus
 Myoporum tenuifolium G.Forster
 Myriophyllum aquaticum (†) (Velloso) Verdc.
 Myriophyllum brasiliensis (†) Camb.
 Myriophyllum heterophyllum (†) Michaux
 Nicotiana glauca (†) R.C. Graham
 Nymphaea mexicana (†) Zucc.
 Opuntia elata (†) Salm-Dyck
 Opuntia ficus-indica (L.) Miller
 Opuntia maxima (†) Miller
 Opuntia subulata (†) (Muehlenpf.) Engelm (= Austrocylindropuntia subulata)
 Opuntia tuna (†) (M) (L.) Mill.
 Oxalis corniculata (†) (M) L.
 Oxalis pes-caprae (†) L.
 Oxalis purpurea (†) L.
 Paraserianthes lophantha (†) (M) (Willd.) I.C. Nielsen [=Albizia distachya (Vent) J.F. Macbr.]
 Parthenium hysterophorus (†) L.
 Paspalum paspalodes (†) (Michx) Scribner
 Paspalum vaginatum (†) Swartz
 Passiflora tripartita (†) (M) (Juss.) Poir. var. mollissima (Kunth) Holm-Niels. & P. Jørg.
 Paulownia tomentosa (†) (Thunberg) Steudel
 Pelargonium inquinans (†) (M) (L.) L'Hér. ex Ait.
 Pennisetum purpureum (†) (M) Schum.
 Pennisetum setaceum (†) (Forssk.) Chiov.
 Pennisetum villosum (†) R. Br. ex Fresen
 Persicaria perfoliata (†) (L.) H. Gross (= Polygonum perfoliatum L.)
 Petroselinum crispum (†) (M) (Mill.) A.W. Hill
 Physalis peruviana (†) (M) L.
 Phytolacca americana (†) L.
 Pistia stratiotes (†) L.
 Pittosporum undulatum (†) Vent.
 Podranea ricasoliana (†) (Tanfani) Sprague
 Polygonum capitatum (†) Buch.-Ham.ex D.Don
 Pueraria lobata (†) (Willdenow) Ohwi (= P. montana var lobata)
 Psidium cattleyanum (†) Sabine
 Reynoutria japonica Houtt.
 Rhus coriaria (†) (M) L.
 Ricinus communis (†) L.
 Robinia pseudoacacia (†) L.
 Sagittaria latifolia (†) Willd.
 Salpichroa origanifolia (†) (M) (Lam.) Thell.
 Salvinia molesta (†) D.S. Mitchell
 Senecio bicolor (†) (Willd.) Tod. ssp. cinerea (DC.) Chater
 Senecio inaequidens (†) DC.
 Senecio mikanioides (†) (M) Otto ex Walp.
 Senecio petasitis (†) (M) (Sims) DC.
 Sesbania punicea (Cav.) Benth.
 Setaria verticillata (†) (M) (L.) P. Beauv.
 Solanum lycopersicum (†) (M) L. var. lycopersicum
 Solanum mauritianum (†) Scop.
 Soleirolia soleirolii (†) (M) (Req.) Dandy
 Sorghum halepense (†) (L.) Pers.
 Spartina densiflora (†) Brongn.
 Symphyotrichum subulatum (†) (M) (Michx.) G. L. Nesom var. squamatum (Spreng.) S. D. Sundb.
 Tamarix gallica (†) (M) L.
 Tetragonia tetragonioides (†) (M) (Pall.) Kuntze
 Tradescantia fluminensis (†) Velloso
 Tradescantia zebrina (†) (M) Hort. ex Bosse Vollst.
 Tropaeolum majus (†) L.
 Ulex europaeus (†) (M) L.
 Ulex minor (†) (M) Roth
 Verbena bonariensis (†) (M) L.
 Verbena rigida (†) (M) Spreng.
 Vinca major (†) (M) L.
 Zantedeschia aethiopica (†) (M) (L.) Spreng.

References

External links 
 Exotic Birds that Nest in Portugal Continental
 Invasive Plant Species in Portugal Continental
 Naturdata list of invasive species in Portugal
 Invasive Plants in Portugal (ABAE)

Portugal
Lists of biota of Portugal